ATG may refer to:

Companies
ATG Stores, an e-tail site
Advanced Technology Group (Apple), a former division of Apple Computer
Advanced Technology Group (Novell), a former division of Novell
Aviation Technology Group, the defunct developer of the Javelin Very Light Jet (VLJ)

Military
Alaska Territorial Guard, a military reserve force in World War II
Anti-tank gun, a mobile weapon used in Anti-tank warfare

Organizations
Alternative Tourism Group, a Palestinian NGO
Ambassador Theatre Group, a theatre group in the UK

Science
ATG, the triplet code for the amino acid methionine and a start codon
Anti-thymocyte globulin, antibodies to prevent and treat transplant rejection
Autophagy gene, a gene coding for protein that facilitates autophagy

Other uses
Ankara Tren Garı, a mixed use building in Ankara, Turkey
Anti Tank Guitar, a string instrument
Art Technology Group, a software developer
Art Theatre Guild, a Japanese film production company
Auto-gating, in night vision devices
The ISO 3166 code for Antigua and Barbuda, a country in the east Caribbean Sea